Assala Mostafa Hatem Nasri (born 15 May 1969), commonly known as Assala, is a Syrian musical artist. She is one of the most popular and famous Arab singers.

Early life and career 
Assala was born in Damascus, Syria to a middle class couple. Mostafa Nasri, Assala's father, was a revered composer and singer. Assala began her musical career by performing patriotic, religious, and children's songs when she was four years old. She sang the theme song "Qessas Al Sho'oub", of the cartoon show, Hekayat Alamiyah. In 1984, Mostafa Nasri died after suffering from internal bleeding caused by a car accident. Aged 15 she helped to take care of her siblings Aman, Ayham, Reem and Anas with her mother Aziza Al-Babelli.

Assala's commercial musical career debuted in 1991 with the Egyptian song hit Law Ta'rafou (Egyptian Arabic: لو تعرفو). The album had 4 Egyptian songs in the oriental operatic Classic Egyptian tarab style. The album was an instant hit in Egypt back at that time with heartbreaking songs like "Ya Sabra Yana" and "Samehtak Ketir". She quickly cemented her presence in the Arabic world a growing industry brimming with singers like Angham, Najwa Karam and Latifa.

Ever since the beginning of the Syrian Civil War, in 2011, Assala Nasri claimed her support for the Syrian people and her commitment against Bashar al Assad. Her positions towards the Civil War are humanitarian, in which she wants the conflict to end for the sake of the Syrian civilians. She had her first composing experience in the writing of one song, released in 2011. For her commitment in the conflict, Assala sang at the International Peace day as a new ambassador for "Peace Building Through Music." However, Assala was criticized for her position, due to the fact that Hafez Al-Assad authorized her treatment from polio.

She was arrested on Monday, 26 June 2017 in Beirut International Airport at the behest of Lebanese officials who support Bashar al-Assad for the crime of fraternizing with Israel. She had recently performed in Palestine. She was placed under house arrest, then quickly released, for lack of evidence, but some pro-Syrian outlets never corrected their claims that she was arrested for carrying drugs.

In 2019, Assala performed "Right Where I'm Supposed to Be" as the Official Song of the 2019 Special Olympics World Summer Games in Abu Dhabi, United Arab Emirates in collaboration with Ryan Tedder, Avril Lavigne, Luis Fonsi, Hussain Al Jassmi and Tamer Hosny.

Television 
Assala hosts a television program which is called Soula, on Al Hayat TV and Dubai TV. The show presents guest musicians as though they were visiting Assala in her home in Cairo, Egypt.

Personal life 
Assala's first marriage was to Ayman Al Dahabi. Her first daughter, Sham, was born in 1992 when she was 22 years old, and her first son, Khaled, in 1998. She divorced in 2005 after more than 15 years of marriage. After the divorce, she received the custody of her two children.

Her second marriage was to a Palestinian-American director, Tarek Alarian, on 26 March 2006. She was pregnant with Alarian's child in early 2007, but suffered a miscarriage halfway through the pregnancy. In May 2011, she gave birth to twin boys, Adam and Aly, via IVF.

In an Instagram post dated 6 January 2020, Assala announced her divorce from her husband Tarek Alarian. Assala currently lives in Cairo with her four children.
In September 2021, she married Faeq Hassan, an Iraqi national who lives in Saudi Arabia.

Assala is a Sunni Muslim. She was granted Bahraini citizenship by Bahraini King Hamad bin Isa Al Khalifa a few days after she gave a performance in the operetta Love and Loyalty in celebration of Bahrain's Independence Day. Assala holds two citizenships: Syrian (primary nationality) and Bahraini (second nationality).

Discography

Studio albums 

 Ya Sabra Yana (Patient Me) (1990)
 Assala Performs Umm Kulthum (1990)
 O'zorni (Forgive Me) (1991)
 Ghayar Awi (He's So Jealous) (1991)
 Taw'am Al Rouh (My Soul's Twin) (1992)
 Ighdab (Be Angry) (1993)
 Wala Tessadda''' (Don't Believe It) (1994)
 Rahal (He Left) (1995)
 Erja' Laha (Return to Her) (1996)
 Al Mushtaka (The Complaint) (1997)
 Alby Bayrtahlak (My Heart Is Comfortable For You) (1998)
 Ya Magnon (O Madman) (1999)
 Moshtaah (I'm Missing You) (2001)
 Yakhy Esaal (Ask About Me) (2002)
 Yamin Allah/Haqiqat Waqe'i (I Swear/My Reality) (2003)
 Ad El Horouf (As Much as the Number of Letters) (2003)
 Awgat (Sometimes) (2004)
 Ady (Ordinary) (2005)
 Hayati (My Life) (2006)
 Sawaha Qalbi (My Heart Has Done It) (2007)
 Nos Hala (Half State) (2008)
 Qanon Kaifak (Law of Your Fancy) (2010)
 Shakhseya Aneeda (A Stubborn Personality) (2012)
 60 De'ee'a Hayah (60 Minutes of Life) (2015)
 Alleg El Deneia (I Hang the World) (2016)
 Mohatamma Bel Tafasil (Interested in the Details) (2017)
 Fi Orbak (Near You) (2019)
 La Testaslem (Don't Give Up) (2020)
 Shayfa Feek (See You) (2022)

 Singles 

 "Law Ta'rafou" (If You Know) from Law Ta'rafou "Ighdab" (Get Angry) from Ighdab "Al Mushtaka" (The Complainer) from Al Mushtaka "Alf Leila We Leila" (One Thousand and One Nights) from Al Mushtaka "Ya Magnoun" (O Madman) from Ya Magnoun "Ma Oultelish" (Why Didn't You Tell Me?) from Ya Magnoun "Moushta'a" (I'm Missing You) from Moushta'a "E'tef Habibi" (Have Mercy My Love) from Moushta'a "Mab'ash Ana" (I Haven't Lived Up to My Name if I Don't) from Moushta'a "Leih El Ghorour" (Why the Arrogance?) from Ya Akhi Es'al "Yamin Allah" (I Swear) from Yamin Allah/Waqe'i "Misheit Senin" (I Walked for Years) from Ad El Horouf "Tassawar" (Imagine) from Ad El Horouf "A'taz Bek" (I Am Proud of You) from Ad El Horouf "Gemarhom Kellohom" (You Are the Moon Among Them) from Awgat "Meta Ashoufek" (When Will I See You?) from Awgat "Fein Habibi" (Where is My Love?) from Aadi "Khalik Shiwaya" (Stay) from Aadi "Asfa" (I'm Sorry) from Aadi "Aktar" (More) from Hayati "Khaliha 'Ala Allah" (Leave It In God's Hands) [Ramadan Single]
 "Jarhi Fel Hawa" (My Injury in Love)
 "Allah Ya Omri Aleik" (You're Amazing)
 "Arod Leih" (Why Reply?) from Hayati "Bein Eideik" (In Your Hands) from Hayati "Alamtni" (You Taught Me) from Hayati "Hayati" (My Life) from Hayati "Egrab Gerrib" (Get Closer) from Sawaha Galbi "Sawaha Galbi" (My Heart Did It) from Sawaha Galbi "La Tekhaf" (Don't Be Afraid) from Sawaha Galbi'' (shot as a music video in 2009)
 "Wala Dary" (Doesn't Care)
 "Sum wa 'Asal" (Poison and Honey) 2010 Single
 "Ah law hal korsy Bye7ki" (If This Chair Would Talk) 2011 - this song is dedicated for the Syrian revolution against Bashar al-Assad. Assala composed this song. It's her first experience in composing.
 "Right Where I'm Supposed to Be" (Ryan Tedder with Avril Lavigne, Luis Fonsi, Hussain Al Jassmi, Assala Nasri and Tamer Hosny) - this was the official song of the Special Olympic World Games Abu Dhabi 2019.
 "Shakhseya Anida" (A Stubborn Personality) 2012
 "El Hakika" 2018
 "El Mustafa" 2018
 "Bent Akaber" 2019
 "Shamekh" 2020
 "Al Farq Al Kabir" 2020
 "La Tashkou Le Nas" 2022 EP
 "Tegoul Tebghani" 2022
 "Goraah" 2022
 "Ghalban" 2022
 "Shayfa Feek" 2022 EP
 "Bi El Salama" 2022
 "Zay El Mougezat" 2022
 "Manni Wafi" 2022
 "Elly Medayea Yefarea" 2022
 "Shayfa Feek" 2022

References

External links 

 

1969 births
Living people
Singers who perform in Egyptian Arabic
Singers who perform in Classical Arabic
Syrian Sunni Muslims
People from Damascus
Rotana Records artists
20th-century Syrian women singers
21st-century Syrian women singers
Syrian film actresses
Syrian television actresses